Claretta and Ben is a 1974 Italian comedy film directed by Gian Luigi Polidoro.

Plot   
Gino Pistone, manager of a provincial company, makes ends meet as best he can. The company is dissolved by the lead actress and he, to reunite it, has a stroke of genius: to stage the story of Benito Mussolini and his latest lover, Claretta Petacci.

The idea works, and Pistone identifies himself too much in the role of Mussolini.

Cast 
 Ugo Tognazzi as Gino Pistone
 Bernadette Lafont as Sandra Pensotti
 Felice Andreasi as Peppino Lo Taglio
 Ernesto Colli as Remengo
 Franco Fabrizi as Franco De Rosa
 Lia Tanzi as Ornella Fiocchi
 Gigi Ballista as friend of Gino
 Luigi Leoni as Carlo Maria
 Germano Longo as Burino
 Ettore Mattia as Falabrino
 Rossana Di Lorenzo as Adriana
 Quinto Parmeggiani as Chimiste
 Pietro Tordi as Naples actor
 Gianfranco Barra as client

See also   
 List of Italian films of 1974

References

External links

1974 films
1974 comedy films
1970s Italian-language films
Films directed by Gian Luigi Polidoro
Commedia all'italiana
Films about theatre
Films scored by Carlo Rustichelli
Films with screenplays by Rafael Azcona
1970s Italian films